Mitar Palikuća (born 1974, in Šabac) is a Serbian disabled table tennis player.

He has won the first medal for Serbia at Summer Paralympics in Rio.

Notes

1974 births
Serbian male table tennis players
Table tennis players at the 2016 Summer Paralympics
Paralympic table tennis players of Serbia
Medalists at the 2016 Summer Paralympics
Paralympic medalists in table tennis
Paralympic bronze medalists for Serbia
Living people
Table tennis players at the 2020 Summer Paralympics